During the 1999–2000 English football season, Fulham F.C. competed in the Football League First Division.

Season summary
Before the 1999-2000 season, Paul Bracewell was appointed as Fulham manager and despite them competing in the top half of Division One throughout the campaign, Bracewell was sacked on 30 March 2000 by millionaire owner Mohamed Al-Fayed after failing to provide instant success that was demanded from the owner who is desperate to see Fulham play Premiership football and Karl-Heinz Riedle along with assistant Roy Evans took over as caretaker managers on a temporary basis until the end of the season and they guided the Cottagers to a 9th-place finish. On 9 April 2000, the more experienced Jean Tigana was appointed as Bracewell's successor and took over in July.

Final league table

Results summary

Results by round

Results
Fulham's score comes first

Legend

Football League First Division

FA Cup

League Cup

Players

First-team squad
Squad at end of season

Left club during season

Reserve squad

References

Notes

Fulham F.C. seasons
Fulham